The Quaid-e-Azam College Of Engineering and Technology (QCET) is a private college located in Sahiwal, Punjab, Pakistan. It offers undergraduate engineering and engineering technology degree programs in affiliation with University of Engineering and Technology, Lahore

Departments and programs

Mechanical Engineering Department
BSc Mechanical Engineering
BSc Mechanical Engineering Technology

Civil Engineering Department
BSc Civil Engineering
BSc Civil Engineering Technology

Electrical Engineering Department
BSc Electrical Engineering
BSc Electrical Engineering echnology
bhenu da phuda

Health Sciences Department
Doctor of Pharmacy
Doctor of Physiotherapy     Fee  230000 per Year

Student societies
 ASME Student Chapter QCET
 ICE QCET
 IEEE QCET
 QCET Debating Society
 QCET Dramatic and Entertainment Society
 QCET Media Society

References

External links
 QCET official website
 Higher Education Commission (HEC) approved colleges list affiliated with universities

Universities and colleges in Sahiwal District
Engineering universities and colleges in Pakistan
2012 establishments in Pakistan
Educational institutions established in 2012
Memorials to Muhammad Ali Jinnah